Beata Dorota Sawicka (born 23 March 1964 in Oława) is a Polish politician. She was elected to the Sejm on 25 September 2005, getting 8,764 votes in 1 Legnica district as a candidate from the Civic Platform list.

See also
Members of Polish Sejm 2005-2007

External links
Beata Dorota Sawicka - parliamentary page - includes declarations of interest, voting record, and transcripts of speeches.

Members of the Polish Sejm 2005–2007
Women members of the Sejm of the Republic of Poland
Civic Platform politicians
1964 births
Living people
21st-century Polish women politicians